Pontodytes cavazzutii is a species of beetle in the family Carabidae, the only species in the genus Pontodytes.

References

Trechinae